Remember Me, My Love (Ricordati di me) is a 2003 Italian movie directed by Gabriele Muccino.

Tagline: Some loves are never forgotten.

Plot
At first glance the Ristuccia family is apparently normal and close-knit, but all of its members are hiding something. Carlo, the head of the family, would like to become a writer rather than continue working in an insurance company. Giulia, his wife, is a schoolteacher who aspires to become an actress. Paolo is an insecure teenager who cannot successfully assert himself in front of girls whom he likes. Valentina desires to become a television showgirl at any cost. This silence is broken when Carlo meets his old love Alessia, with whom he starts an extra-marital affair. As a result, he almost ruins the family balance although Giulia tries to save the marriage.

Awards
 3 Nastro d'Argento Prizes (Best Supporting Actress: Monica Bellucci - Best Screenplay: Gabriele Muccino and Heidrun Schleef - Best Producer: Domenico Procacci and Nadine Luque)

Soundtrack
 Elisa with Almeno tu nell'universo
 Belladonna with Killer (ogni istante è l'ultimo)
 Imani Coppola with Fake is the new real

Cast
Fabrizio Bentivoglio: Carlo Ristuccia
Laura Morante: Giulia Ristuccia
Nicoletta Romanoff: Valentina Ristuccia
Monica Bellucci: Alessia
Silvio Muccino: Paolo Ristuccia
Gabriele Lavia: Alfredo
Enrico Silvestrin: Stefano Manni
Silvia Cohen: Elena
Alberto Gimignani: Riccardo
Amanda Sandrelli: Louise
Blas Roca-Rey: Matt
Pietro Taricone: Paolo Tucci
Giulia Michelini: Ilaria
Maria Chiara Augenti: Anna Pezzi
Andrea Roncato: Luigi
Stefano Santospago: André

External links

2003 films
Italian romantic drama films
2000s Italian-language films
2003 romantic drama films
Films set in Rome
Films directed by Gabriele Muccino
2000s Italian films